is a railway station in the town of Mori, Shizuoka Prefecture, Japan, operated by the third sector Tenryū Hamanako Railroad.

Lines
Towata Station is served by the Tenryū Hamanako Line, and is located 12.0 kilometers from the starting point of the line at Kakegawa Station.

Station layout
The station has one elevated side platform serving a single track. The station is built on an embankment, with a small station building located at the platform, connected to the street by stairs. The station is unattended.

Adjacent stations

|-
!colspan=5|Tenryū Hamanako Railroad

Station history
Towata Station was established on April 13, 1960 a station on the Japan National Railway Futamata line. After the privatization of JNR on March 15, 1987, the station came under the control of the Tenryū Hamanako Line.

Passenger statistics
In fiscal 2016, the station was used by an average of 128 passengers daily (boarding passengers only).

Surrounding area
The station is located in a residential area.

See also
 List of Railway Stations in Japan

External links

  Tenryū Hamanako Railroad Station information 
 

Railway stations in Shizuoka Prefecture
Railway stations in Japan opened in 1960
Stations of Tenryū Hamanako Railroad
Mori, Shizuoka